is a former Japanese football player and manager. He played for the Japan national team.

Club career
Fujishima was born in Akita on April 8, 1950. After graduating from high school, he joined Nippon Kokan in 1969. The club won 1980 JSL Cup and 1981 Emperor's Cup. He retired in 1986. He was selected Best Eleven 4 times (1971, 1976, 1977 and 1978).

National team career
In September 1971, Fujishima was selected for the Japan national team for the 1972 Summer Olympics qualification. At that competition, on September 29, he debuted against Chinese Taipei. He also played in the 1974 and 1978 Asian Games. He also served as captain from 1978. He played 65 games and scored seven goals for Japan until 1979.

Coaching career
After retirement, Fujishima started a coaching career at Nippon Kokan. In 1999, he signed with Japanese Regional Leagues club YKK. He promoted the club to Japan Football League in 2001. He resigned in 2002.

Club statistics

National team statistics

References

External links
 
 Japan National Football Team Database

1950 births
Living people
Association football people from Akita Prefecture
Japanese footballers
Japan international footballers
Japan Soccer League players
NKK SC players
Footballers at the 1974 Asian Games
Footballers at the 1978 Asian Games
Japanese football managers
Association football midfielders
Asian Games competitors for Japan